Gamious is a Dutch video game developer and publisher founded in Haarlem, Netherlands, in February 2011.

History 
Gamious was founded in 2011 by Pim and Jos Bouman. They created a platform called the "Game Train" to collaborate with other game developers. The Game Train enabled freelancing game developers to work with Gamious to create games. Gamious would publish and market the game, and share the revenue with the developers. Gamious had a database of over 400 people working on 21 projects. Gamious eventually dropped the Game Train as they felt that it was too much for them and gave back the titles to their respective owners.

Some Game Train games were developed further, and became some of Gamious's early released Briquid and iO.

Games

Awards

Game Reviews 
Escapist magazine wrote a review of their game Lake "Overall, Lake is a down-to-Earth title that highlights finding peace in a familiar place. Both the gameplay and story are easygoing, resulting in a relaxing journey of self-discovery. Although the town is beautiful and offers some engaging characters, it doesn’t inject enough life into it, making the overall experience dull and repetitive"

Game Rant wrote about same game Lake, "Lake is not like a ton of other AAA or indie games on the market. In a game industry dominated by genre titans with intense gameplay like Call of Duty and Fortnite, Lake offers a strikingly ordinary premise."

References

External links 
 

2011 establishments in the Netherlands
Video game companies established in 2011
Video game companies of the Netherlands
Video game development companies
Video game publishers